Gupis @ Sumpis (Goopechh) Valley is located about 112 kilometers to the west of Gilgit on the bank of River Gilgit, District Ghizer, Gilgit-Baltistan, Pakistan.
The Gupis is 2176 meters above sea level. This fort was once used by the military for defence purposes. Later the king (Raja) of the time lived in this fort for several years.

Location
Latitude: 36°13'46.82"
Longitude: 73°26'40.49"

Livelihood
Villagers earn their livelihood through the cultivation and farming of animals including Marco Polo sheep, ibexes, and yaks.

Castes
Local castes settled in this area are the Murraty, Zagary, Kakakhail, Bodonge, Broosho, Gilite, Burange,Sher khane, Sukhe, Bujuke, Phate, Dorane, Shamshere, Shale, and Sarale. The people mostly belong to the Murraty (Yashkuns) caste. The languages spoken there are Brooshaaski, Khowar and Shhena.

Tourist attractions
Major tourist attractions include points such as Gupis fort, Khatli Lake, stone circles of megaliths, Shingalote village, and many more. Beyond Gupis, a road leads to Chitral via the Shandur pass, where the highest polo ground in the world is located “within the territory of Goopech.”

Khalti Lake
Khalti Lake is located in Gupis, District Ghizer, Tehsil Punial. It is 20–30 minutes drive from Gupis. Khalti Lake is famous for being the habitat of trout fish. The lake is formed due to stretch of river near the village of Khalti.

References

External links
Gilgit-baltistan.com 
Dostpakistan.pk
Gbtribune.blogspot.com

Populated places in Ghizer District
Valleys of Gilgit-Baltistan